Valentin Scheidel (born 1883) was a German physicist.

Scheidel received his doctorate from the University of Munich in 1911, under Arnold Sommerfeld.

Notes

1883 births
Year of death missing
20th-century German physicists
Ludwig Maximilian University of Munich alumni
Place of birth missing